Seloncourt is a commune in the Doubs department in the Bourgogne-Franche-Comté region in eastern France.

Geography
It is only  from Switzerland.

History
The name of Seloncourt appears for the first time in 1170 in a deed of gift of a meix (House) made by Valner and Damjustin with the Abbey of Belchamp, but certainly existed well before this date. Seloncourt belonged to the Count of Montbéliard since the creation of the fortified city of Montbéliard. It was separated in 1282, to enter, by constitution, in the Seigniory (Lordship) of Blamont until the reintegration of this Seigniory into the Count of Montbéliard and finally in the Canton of Hérimoncourt created by decree May 12, 1898.

Seloncourt was under the rule of the County of Württemberg beginning in 1397.  During the province's allegiance to the Württemberg it embraced Lutheranism. In 1588 there were 24 families and 116 inhabitants in Seloncourt. Seloncourt was reattached to France in 1793 after the French Revolution.

Economy
Seloncourt was a center of watchmaking in the 18th and 19th centuries. Firms located here included Frères Beurnier.

Population

Personalities
Seloncourt was the birthplace of:
 George David Coulon, artist
 Henri Fertet (1926-1943), French Resistance fighter, born in Seloncourt
 Élisabeth Renaud (1846-1932), co-founder, Groupe Feministe Socialiste

Internal relations
Seloncourt is twinned with:
 Villongo, Italy

See also
 Communes of the Doubs department

References

External links

 Seloncourt home page
 Seloncourt-Badeval Parish
 Friends of Old Seloncourt

Communes of Doubs